Waldemar Kazimierz Achramowicz (born 3 November 1949 in Toruń, Poland) is a Polish politician who is a current Member of Kuyavian-Pomeranian Regional Assembly. Between 1999 and 2006 he was Kuyavian-Pomeranian Voivodeship Marshal. He was Toruń City Councillors also (1994–1998).

In 1998 Polish local election he joined the Regional Assembly I term representing the 4th district. Assembly elected him as Voivodeship Marshal (Marszałek Województwa Kujawsko-Pomorskiego), chairperson of voivodeship executive board.

In 2002 Polish local election he was elected again. He polled 14,652 votes and was first on the Democratic Left Alliance-Labor Union list. Assembly II term elected him as Voivodeship Marshal again.

In 2006 local election he was elected third time. He scored 14,205 votes, running on the Left and Democrats list.

See also 
 Kuyavian-Pomeranian Regional Assembly

References

External links 
 (pl) Kuyavian-Pomeranian Regional Assembly webside

1949 births
Living people
People from Toruń
Democratic Left Alliance politicians
Kuyavian-Pomeranian Voivodeship Marshals
Members of Kuyavian-Pomeranian Regional Assembly